William Roy Shill (March 6, 1923 – August 15, 1998) was a Canadian professional ice hockey player who played 79 games in the National Hockey League with the Boston Bruins between 1942 and 1947. After his professional career, Shill played for the East York Lyndhursts during the 1954 Ice Hockey World Championships.

Playing career
Shill first joined the Bruins during the 1942–43 season, when he played 7 games. He played a further 45 games in 1945–46 and 27 in 1946–47. Shill scored 21 regular season goals and accrued 13 assists. Shill tallied one goal and assisted on two others in seven games during the 1946 Stanley Cup playoffs.

Career statistics

Regular season and playoffs

International

References

Bibliography

External links
 

1923 births
1998 deaths
Boston Bruins players
Canadian expatriates in the United States
Canadian ice hockey right wingers
Dallas Texans (USHL) players
East York Lyndhursts players
Hershey Bears players
Ontario Hockey Association Senior A League (1890–1979) players
Ottawa Senators (QSHL) players
Seattle Ironmen players
Ice hockey people from Toronto
Toronto Young Rangers players
Vancouver Canucks (WHL) players